VSNL Western Europe (previously TGN Western Europe) is a telecommunications cable system with both submarine and terrestrial parts linking several counties in western Europe.

The cable system is constructed from cables with 4 fibre pairs per cable, and each fibre pair supports 96 10Gbit/s waves at construction, allowing for a total lit capacity (at construction) of 4 fibre pairs x 96 10 Gbit/s waves = 3,840 Gbit/s.

It has two submarine cables, one with landing points in:
Seixal, District of Setúbal, Portugal
Highbridge, Somerset, United Kingdom

and the other with landing points in
Bilbao, Biscay, Spain
Highbridge, Somerset, United Kingdom

The Seixal and Bilbao landing points are interconnected terrestrially via Lisbon, Portugal and Madrid, Spain.  Highbridge is connected via a pair of cables to London, United Kingdom

References

 

Submarine communications cables in the North Atlantic Ocean
Portugal–United Kingdom relations
Spain–United Kingdom relations
Portugal–Spain relations